East Belfast GAA is a Gaelic Athletic Association club located in east Belfast in County Down, Northern Ireland. The team currently plays in the Down Senior County League. The team is noted for its cross community inclusion which differs from other GAA teams in Northern Ireland where the majority of followers are usually derived from the Nationalist community. East Belfast GAA have been a cross-community team since its inception with the inclusion of both Unionists and Nationalists personnel, and actively promotes friendship and cooperation between both sides of the political divide. It is the first GAA club to be based in East Belfast since St Colmcille's was formed in the 1950s but folded at the beginnings of the Troubles.

History 

The club was formed in May 2020 by cross-community worker and former Carryduff GAA player Richard Maguire, and former London GAA player David McGreevy who had moved back to Northern Ireland in late 2018.  They were joined by Irial O'Cealliagh, Kenny Caldwell and David Doherty, when the five held the first meeting at Bunscoil Mhic Reachtain, Belfast to create the club.  After decades long absence of a GAA club in the historically Loyalist East Belfast, McGreevy initially hoped to set up a boys U12 team, and put out a message on Twitter asking for help setting up a GAA club.

The club crest was revealed on 16 July 2020. It features primarily an outline of the Harland and Wolff cranes which is an iconic symbol of the area, a shamrock, a thistle & a red hand, along with the club's motto "Together" written in the three languages of Northern Ireland; English, Irish ("Le Chéile") and Ulster-Scots ("Thegither"). The crest was designed by creative director Rory Millar.

On 5 August 2020, there was a hoax bomb alert at the team's training ground of Henry Jones Playing Fields which was believed to have been aimed at East Belfast GAA. The incident was condemned by all local politicians on both sides of the divide including the unionist DUP's Gavin Robinson MP & nationalist SDLP's Lisnasharragh Councillor Séamas de Faoite.

On 12 September due to the COVID-19 pandemic in Northern Ireland, all club activity was stopped for a week as advised by the GAA and the NHS as one of the team members tested positive for COVID-19. On the 19 September, the senior camogie team had its first win, beating St Enda's GAC  reserve camogie team 7-11 to 2-2. This is the club's first win since forming the GAC.

References

External links
 
 
 A video interview with one of the co-founders of East Belfast Dave McGreevy about East Belfast GAA

2020 establishments in Ireland
Gaelic games clubs in County Down